Martha Zelt (born 1930) is an American printmaker.

A native of Washington, Pennsylvania, Zelt received her bachelor's degree from Temple University.  Other institutions at which she studied include Connecticut College; the Pennsylvania Academy of the Fine Arts; the New School for Social Research, under Antonio Frasconi; the Museum of Modern Art of São Paulo, under Johnny Friedlaender; and the University of New Mexico, under Garo Antreasian.

Her work has appeared in many group exhibitions in the United States and elsewhere, and her work is represented in the collections of the Brooklyn Museum of Art, the Carnegie Museum of Art, the Pennsylvania Academy of the Fine Arts, the Philadelphia Museum of Art, and Princeton University.

Among awards which she has received are the Cresson Traveling Scholarship for 1954 and the Scheidt memorial travelling award from the Pennsylvania Academy of the Fine Arts, a 1965 fellowship from Philadelphia's Print Club, and a 1982 grant from the Roswell Museum and Art Center in New Mexico.

As an instructor she has taught at the Pennsylvania Academy of the Fine Arts, from 1968 to 1982; the University of the Arts, from 1969 to 1982; and the University of North Carolina at Chapel Hill, in 1981; she chaired the art department of Virginia Intermont College from 1985 to 1989 and was a visiting professor at the University of Delaware from 1989 to 1990.

Her work is in the collection of the Smithsonian American Art Museum and the Pennsylvania Academy of the Fine Arts.

References

1930 births
Living people
American women printmakers
20th-century American printmakers
21st-century American printmakers
20th-century American women artists
21st-century American women artists
People from Washington, Pennsylvania
Artists from Pennsylvania
Temple University alumni
Connecticut College alumni
Pennsylvania Academy of the Fine Arts alumni
The New School alumni
University of New Mexico alumni
Pennsylvania Academy of the Fine Arts faculty
University of the Arts (Philadelphia) faculty
University of North Carolina at Chapel Hill faculty
Virginia Intermont College faculty
University of Delaware faculty
American women academics